Charles James Treasure (2 December 1895–1985) was an English footballer who played in the Football League for Bristol City and Halifax Town.

References

1890s births
1985 deaths
English footballers
Association football defenders
English Football League players
Paulton Rovers F.C. players
Bristol City F.C. players
Halifax Town A.F.C. players